The following is a list of Hofstra Pride football seasons.

Seasons

References

 
Hofstra
Hofstra Pride football seasons